The Key West Lighthouse is located in Key West, Florida. The first Key West lighthouse was a  tower completed in 1825. It had 15 lamps in  reflectors.

History 
The first keeper, Michael Mabrity, died in 1832, and his widow, Barbara, became the lighthouse keeper, serving for 32 years. The Great Havana Hurricane of 1846 destroyed the lighthouse; the USS Morris, which was wrecked during the storm, reported "a white sand beach covers the spot where Key West Lighthouse stood". Barbara Mabrity survived, but fourteen people who had sought refuge in the lighthouse tower died, including seven members of her family. (The same hurricane destroyed the Sand Key Lighthouse, eight miles (13 km) away, killing six people, including the keeper, Rebecca Flaherty, another widow of a previous keeper.) Barbara Mabrity continued to serve as keeper of the Key West Light until the early 1860s, when she was fired at age 82 for making statements against the Union (Key West remained under Union control throughout the Civil War).

As both lighthouses serving Key West had been destroyed in the 1846 hurricane, a ship, the Honey, was acquired and outfitted as a lightship to serve as the Sand Key Light until new lighthouses could be built. Due to efforts to reorganize the Lighthouse Board, Congress was slow to appropriate funds for the new lighthouses. The new tower for the Key West Light was completed in 1848. In 1858 the light received a third-order Fresnel lens. In 1873 the lantern was replaced (it had been damaged by a hurricane in 1866), adding three feet to the height of the tower.

After the Coast Guard decommissioned the Key West Light in 1969, it was turned over to Monroe County, which in turn leased it to the Key West Arts and Historical Society. The society operates the lighthouse and its associated buildings as the Key West Light House and Keeper's Quarters Museum. On display at the museum is the first-order Fresnel lens from the Sombrero Key lighthouse.

Other 
In 2020 the Key West Art and Historical Society announced they designed a new small-group visitor area at the Lighthouse because of the Pandemic.

References

External links 
 Key West Light House and Keeper's Quarters Museum – official site

 http://www.kwahs.org/

Lighthouses completed in 1825
Lighthouses completed in 1849
Light
Light
Light
Key West
Light
Light
Maritime museums in Florida
Lighthouse museums in Florida
1849 establishments in Florida